The Federal Championship was a secondary football tournament in 1908 Italy where foreign players (if they lived in Italy) were also allowed to play; the winners would be proclaimed Campioni Federali (Federal Champions).

It was boycotted by all major clubs, and consequently later annulled by the Italian Football Federation.

Federal Championship
Genoa and Torino didn't enter in the competition. Milan withdrew from the tournament on January 1, 1908, in order to protest against FIF.

Final
Played on January 19 and February 23

|}
Classification

Playoff (Turin, March 16)

|}
Cancelled and repeated for a mistake made by the referee during the match

Playoff (Torino, May 10)

|}

Juventus Federal Champions

Juventus didn't receive Coppa Spensley as prize because Milan, the club who won the Cup in 1906 and 1907, refused to give the Cup to Juventus and gave it to Spensley and Genoa in order to protest against FIF. In the Federal Assembly of 1908 FIF decided to assign permanently Spensley Cup to Milan.

References and sources
Almanacco Illustrato del Calcio – La Storia 1898–2004, Panini Edizioni, Modena, September 2005
Carlo Chiesa, La grande storia del calcio italiano, 2nd episode: Juve, scippati due titoli! Inter, l'atroce beffa (1908–1910, pp. 17–32, Guerin Sportivo #5 (May 2012).
Online digitalized Archive of newspaper La Stampa of Turin.

References